The Third Wave is a 1980 book by Alvin Toffler. It is the sequel to Future Shock (1970), and the second in what was originally likely meant to be a trilogy that was continued with Powershift: Knowledge, Wealth and Violence at the Edge of the 21st Century in 1990. A new addition, Revolutionary Wealth, was published, however, in 2006 and may be considered as a major expansion of The Third Wave.

Toffler's book describes the transition in developed countries from Industrial Age society, which he calls the "Second Wave", to Information Age "Third Wave" society.

Toffler's wave theory
In the book Toffler describes three types of societies, based on the concept of 'waves'—each wave pushes the older societies and cultures aside.
 The First Wave is the settled agricultural society which prevailed in much of the world after the Neolithic Revolution, which replaced hunter-gatherer cultures.
 The Second Wave is Industrial Age society. The Second Wave began in Western Europe with the Industrial Revolution, and subsequently spread across the world. Key aspects of Second Wave society are the nuclear family, a factory-type education system and the corporation. Toffler writes: "The Second Wave Society is industrial and based on mass production, mass distribution, mass consumption, mass education, mass media, mass recreation, mass entertainment, and weapons of mass destruction. You combine those things with standardization, centralization, concentration, and synchronization, and you wind up with a style of organization we call bureaucracy."
 The Third Wave is the post-industrial society. Toffler says that since the late 1950s most countries have been transitioning from a Second Wave society into a Third Wave society. He coined many words to describe it and mentions names invented by others, such as the Information Age.

Anthropological interpretation
The transition from the earlier hunter-gatherer societies to the agrarian and agricultural societies is also known as the Neolithic Revolution. This coincides with the transition from the Mesolithic era to the Neolithic era (respectively, the Middle and Late Stone Age). The transition from the Paleolithic to the Mesolithic (Early to Middle Stone Age), in turn, largely coincides with the emergence of the modern Homo sapiens from earlier, related archaic human species.

Nearly extinct in the present-day world, hunter-gatherer societies (which one might term the "Zero Wave" societies) are not recognized in Toffler's scheme. Similarly, in the classical three-age system, distinctions are recognized between the Stone Age era Bronze Age, Iron Age, the boundary between the latter two c. 1300–1200 BCE being as dramatic as that demarcating Toffler's waves. None of these phases are clearly recognized in the Toffler scheme, in part due to the prevalence of the latter phase amongst present-day pre-industrial societies.

The transition from Toffler's First Wave and Second Wave is sometimes also recognized as a transition from the Iron Age to the Steel Age. At present, there is no clear delineation of the latest transition, though sometimes the term post-industrial society, originating from Daniel Bell, is used, in addition to Toffler's "Third Wave society".

The important point is that the nature of society (relationships between people and political and economic structures) is significantly altered by the impact of new technology. That to some degree peoples lives are modified to serve the technology.

Key characteristics of the third wave society

Though the society foreseen is still emerging, with the dramatic transitions of the past two decades (e.g. cell phones, Internet, the rise of non-national and super-national powers, etc.), several distinguishing features were posed as characteristic of this new society. Among others, these included
 The rolling back of the Industrial-Era creed of "standardization", as exemplified in the one-size-fits-all approach typical of institutions of this era, such as the education system, factories, governments, mass media, high volume mass production and distribution, etc.
 The attack on the nation-state from above and below and progressive obsolescence of the nation-state itself.
 The assault on the nation-state from below would include both the gradual loss of consensus, such as has characterized the politics of the United States in the 21st century, as well as political turmoil in China (largely split amongst urban-rural lines), Israel (orthodox vs. secular), the Islamic world (fundamentalist or traditional vs. secular) and elsewhere. It would include the rise of regional interests and the progressive devolution of the nation-state itself; e.g. the autonomization of Wales and Scotland in Britain; of Nunavut and Canada; the frequent incidence of separatist movements, the dissolution of Yugoslavia, Czechoslovakia, the USSR, Ethiopia, the emergence of microstates, such as East Timor.
 The assault on the nation-state from above would include the rise of powerful non-national entities: NGO's, multinational corporations, religions with global reach, and even terrorist organizations or cartels. It would include the progressive hemming-in of national economies and of nation-states under a growing network of super-national organizations and affiliations; e.g. the European Union, the North American Union, the newly formed African Union, as well as organizations such as the WTO, NAFTA or International Criminal Court.
 The eclipsing of monetary wealth by knowledge and information as the primary determinant of power and its distribution. This was also discussed more fully in the sequel Powershift.
 The eclipsing of manufacturing and manufacturing goods by knowledge-production and information-processing as the primary economic activity. This was significantly expanded on in the sequel Powershift, where Toffler nearly drew the line between the two along gender lines, coining the term material-ismo (a play on "machismo") to represent the infatuation with the industrial era world of manufacturing (as opposed to paper-pushing), and equating value with product (as opposed equating value with information). The criticism came down particularly hard on the former Stalinist societies, that have in recent years seen a substantial dislocation, particularly along gender lines, with female life expectancy now as much as 10 years greater than male life expectancy throughout the former USSR.
 The emergence of various high technologies, such as cloning, global communications networks, nanotechnology, etc. However, these aspects were discussed in greater depth in Future Shock and somewhat deemphasized in The Third Wave.
 A transformation of the very character of democracy, itself, from rule-by-periodic polling at the election booth, toward a more direct interaction between the government and its populace. To a large extent, this has already emerged with the rise of the Internet, though it has not yet congealed in the form of a fundamental revision of the constitution of any state.
 The transition to an "electronic cottage" where a large demographic works from home. This was eerily prophetic and precipitated by the pandemic. Office buildings in downtowns across the "first world" are experiencing unprecedented vacancies.

Discussing the book in a later interview, Toffler said that industrial-style, centralized, top-down bureaucratic planning would be replaced by a more open, democratic, decentralized style which he called "anticipatory democracy".

Despite the forecast of the obsolescence of the order of nation-states, and the rise of super-national entities, what was not forecast was the emergence of a world political union cast in the form of the United States of Earth. In the framework of the Wave Theory of Toffler, such an institution, if constituted along lines similar to present-day nation states, would represent the very archetype of the Second Wave writ large. Curiously, the potential of a federal world union cast in the mould of a heterogeneous mix (e.g. nations, labor unions, religions affiliations, businesses, popular assemblies, IGOs, etc. all brought together in an overlapping mix) was left open.

Toffler left open both the question of what the outcome of the transformation of the structure of democracy was to entail, as well as the question of what kind of world order would supersede the order of nation-states. This became particularly acute in the 1993 addendum War and Anti-War which raised the issue of the "Genie out of the Bottle" (nuclear proliferation) and the illusion of the "Zone of Peace" being broken (i.e., 9-11, Madrid, London, etc.), but remained silent on the questions of what changes in the structure of the world would be required to resolve these dilemmas, if the nation-state is to become obsolete and "United States of Earth" type global organizations just as much so.

Fourth wave
Though talk about another major historical watershed on a par with the Neolithic Revolution may seem premature, given that the Third Wave has only reached its crest with the advent of the Internet, one of the central themes of Future Shock is that history, itself, would accelerate to the point where all of the past would catch up with the present. Therefore, the question has been raised with increasing frequency as to whether a Fourth Wave is looming or already underway with the most recent dislocations that appear to be taking place in the world.

There has already been one book, published in 1993, titled Fourth Wave: Business in the 21st Century by Herman Bryant Maynard and Susan E. Mehrtens, which forecasts and advocates the rise of a form of eco-globalism in the 21st century. A closer reading of the book, however, may mistake its central theme as a partial completion of the questions left open by Toffler concerning the nature of Third Wave society at the global level, rather than another major historical watershed.

However, the question is still unresolved and no official word was provided by Toffler.

Kim Dae-jung
While imprisoned under military rule in South Korea, the future president of South Korea, Kim Dae-jung was handed this book by his wife. In his autobiography, Kim said The Third Wave was the inspiration that gave him a dream of making Korea an "ICT (information and communications technology) powerhouse". Today, South Korea's cyberinfrastructure is considered to be his great legacy.

References

External links
 A Summary Of The Book
 Booknotes interview with Alvin and Heidi Toffler on Creating a New Civilization: The Politics of the Third Wave, April 16, 1995.

1980 non-fiction books
Bantam Books books
Books by Alvin Toffler
Futurology books
Information Age
Technology in society
Postindustrial society